Karaichevsky is a rural locality (a khutor) in Nizhnedolgovskoye Rural Settlement, Nekhayevsky District, Volgograd Oblast, Russia. The population was 35 as of 2010. There are 2 streets.

Geography 
Karaichevsky is located on Kalach Upland, 33 km north of Nekhayevskaya (the district's administrative centre) by road. Bereznyagovsky is the nearest rural locality.

References 

Rural localities in Nekhayevsky District